Giovanni Franceschi (born 25 April 1963 in Milan) is an Italian swimmer who won two five medals in medley disciplines at European Championships of 1981–1983. He also competed in three events at the 1980 and 1984 Summer Olympics with the best achievement of eights place in the 400 m medley in 1984. During his career, Franceschi won 41 national titles in various freestyle, backstroke, butterfly and medley events. At the 1983 European Championships, held in Rome, he won both the 200 and 400 medley events, setting a European record in both finals.

Biography
His elder brother, Raffaele Franceschi, is also a retired Olympic swimmer. He encouraged Giovanni to start swimming in a pool, which was located just meters from their home.

Franceschi is currently leading a project, SwimCamp, which aims to improve swimming technique of any participant older than 8 years old.

References

External links
 Official site

1963 births
Living people
Italian male swimmers
Swimmers at the 1980 Summer Olympics
Swimmers at the 1984 Summer Olympics
Olympic swimmers of Italy
Swimmers from Milan
World Aquatics Championships medalists in swimming
European Aquatics Championships medalists in swimming
Mediterranean Games gold medalists for Italy
Mediterranean Games silver medalists for Italy
Swimmers at the 1979 Mediterranean Games
Swimmers at the 1983 Mediterranean Games
Mediterranean Games medalists in swimming
20th-century Italian people